Sylvia Zaradic is a Canadian voice actress. She has worked primarily with The Ocean Group in Vancouver.

Animation roles

References

External links

Zaradic,Sylvia
Canadian people of Croatian descent
Living people
Year of birth missing (living people)